Reverend is an American heavy metal band that was originally based in Seattle, Washington, and is based in San Antonio, Texas. Reverend was formed in 1989 by ex-Metal Church vocalist David Wayne, who took the band's name from his own moniker, which he acquired as the frontman of the "Metal Church". Reverend has gone through many lineup versions since its original inception, and despite David Wayne's death in 2005, the band is still active and continues to play in his honor.

History
After struggling with drug problems within his current band, David Wayne decided to leave Metal Church in the late '80's and find another group to join. Wayne searched around Los Angeles looking for the best band in which he could participate. He met with ex-W.A.S.P. member Randy Piper and considered joining Piper's band Animal, but Wayne decided against it because Animal was experiencing the same problems which caused his departure from Metal Church.

Around this time, Heretic, the band whose singer, Mike Howe, recently left to replace Wayne in Metal Church, called David Wayne repeatedly and urged him to at least listen to their songs. Despite being reluctant at first, Wayne eventually met with the members of Heretic at a Denny's restaurant where they played him some of their songs on a tape recorder. Wayne was impressed, and decided that they were the right band for him, thus laying the foundation of Reverend. Wayne later described this ironic episode as a "cosmic joke" on everyone involved.

Members

Last line-up
 Jason Martinez – guitars (2010)
 Nacho Vara – guitars (2002–2010)
 Marco Villareal – bass (2010)
 Dave Galbert (2009–2010)

Former members

Vocals
 David Wayne (1989–2005)
 Michael Lance (2006–2009)
 Scott Marker (2009)
 Michael Falletta (2009-2010)
 Eric "The Viking" Wayne  (2005–2006)

Bass
 Jay Wegener (2002–2003)
 John Stahlman (2000–2002)
 Dennis O'Hara (1989–1991)
 Angelo Espino (1991–1993)
 Pete Perez (2002)
 Brendon Kyle (2004–2008)
 Mike Falletta (2008–2010)
 James Cooper (1994–1995)
 Marco Villarreal (2010)

Guitars
 Davy Lee (2002–2010)
 Chris Nelson (2000–2002)
 Bill Rhynes (1992–2000)
 Brian Korban (1989–1993)
 Stuart Fujinami (1989–1991)
 Ernesto F. Martinez (1991–1993)

Drums
 Rick Basha (1990–1991)
 Jason Ian Rosenfeld (1991–1993)
 Scott Vogel (1989–1990)
 Todd Stotz (2000–2003)
 Jesse Vara (2004–2008)
 Angel Medellin (2008)

Discography

Albums
 World Won't Miss You (1990)
 Play God (1991)
 Resurrected (2010-2011?)

EPs
 Reverend (1989)
 Live (1992)
 A Gathering of Demons (2001)

References

External links
 
 Discography on nolifetilmetal

American power metal musical groups
American thrash metal musical groups
Heavy metal musical groups from Washington (state)
Heavy metal musical groups from Texas
Musical groups established in 1989
Musical groups disestablished in 1993
Musical groups reestablished in 2000
American speed metal musical groups